The spot-throated flameback (Dinopium everetti) is a species of bird in the family Picidae. It is endemic to the Philippines only being found in the province of Palawan in the islands of Balabac, Busuanga and Calamian and mainland Palawan..  It is sometimes considered a subspecies of the common flameback.It is found in moist lowland forests including primary, secondary and even plantations and clearings provided there are still standing trees. It is threatened by habitat loss.

Description 

EBird describes the bird as "A large woodpecker of wooded habitats on Palawan and neighboring islands. Whitish below with dark scaling and golden-olive above with a diffuse reddish mark on the back and a finely spotted, pale cream-colored throat. Angular crest is black with a red tip in females and entirely red in males, which also have a small red moustache patch. Similar to Red-headed Flameback, but Spot-throated has black-and-white stripes on the head and a dark rather than pale yellow bill. Voice includes a loud, stuttering, staccato “ki-ki-ki-ki-ki-ki-ki-ki!” trailing off at the end."

Habitat and Conservation Status 
The flameback occurs in forests and open woodlands, including coconut plantations, indicating some tolerance for human-altered habitat, but the species is considered uncommon. It typically inhabits the lowlands, with breeding reported March and April. 

IUCN has assessed this bird as near-threatened. with the population being estimated at 2,500 to 9,999 mature individuals. This species' main threat is habitat loss.

Lowland forest loss, degradation and fragmentation have been extensive and are ongoing on Palawan and logging and mining concessions have been granted for most remaining forest tracts on the island. Illegal logging is thought to persist across much of the south.

It is recommended to determine its precise ecological requirements and its ability to persist in degraded and fragmented habitats. Ensure the effective protection of existing protected areas in which it occurs.

References

Collar, N.J. 2011. Species limits in some Philippine birds including the Greater Flameback Chrysocolaptes lucidus. Forktail number 27: 29–38.

spot-throated flameback
Birds of Palawan
Endemic birds of the Philippines
spot-throated flameback